Swantham Bharya Zindabad is a 2010 Malayalam film produced by Raaffi Mathirra under the banner Ifar International and directed by Biju Vattappara, starring Guinness Pakru, Mukesh and Sruthilakshmi in the lead roles.

Plot
Pakru plays a Communist Vettoor Sivankutty in the film. He marries, who doesn't believe in Communist ideals. She is a big fan of superstar Pavan Kumar. The movie develops Sivankutty's plight when Pavan Kumar arrives in the village for a film shooting.

Cast
Guinness Pakru as Vettoor Sivankutty
Mukesh as Pavan Kumar
Harisree Ashokan as Uthaman
Sruthi Lakshmi as Meenakshi
Suraj Venjaramood as Dr. Ulpalakshan
Salim Kumar as T.K Vipin Kumar
Mala Aravindan as Party Secretary
Sreejith K as Meenakshi's Brother
Jaffar Idukki as Balan
Saju Kodiyan as Film Director
Kalabhavan Haneef as Production Executive
Thesni Khan as Ambujam
Raghavan as Shivankutty's Father
Manka Mahesh as Shivankutty's Mother
Meena Ganesh as Vasanthi
Mafiya Sasi as himself

References

 Nowrunning article
 OneIndia article
 Cinecurry article
 
 

2010 films
2010s Malayalam-language films
2010 comedy films
Indian comedy films